The Meledis Formation is a geologic formation in Austria. It preserves fossils dating back to the Carboniferous period.

See also

 List of fossiliferous stratigraphic units in Austria

References
 

Carboniferous Austria
Geologic formations of Italy
Carboniferous System of Europe
Carboniferous southern paleotropical deposits